Denis Michaud (born 4 October 1946) is a Canadian luger. He competed in the men's singles event at the 1976 Winter Olympics.

References

1946 births
Living people
Canadian male lugers
Olympic lugers of Canada
Lugers at the 1976 Winter Olympics
People from Saint-Jérôme
Sportspeople from Quebec